Siratus senegalensis is a species of sea snail, a marine gastropod mollusk in the family Muricidae, the murex snails or rock snails.

Description

Distribution
Southern Caribbean to southern Brazil (has been located in Western Africa, originally Senegal, but it is apparently erroneous, according to Radwin & D´Attilio, 1976 and Rios, 2009)

References

 Adanson, M., 1757 Histoire naturelle du Sénégal. Coquillages, p. 275 p, 19 pls
 Fischer-Piette, E., 1942. Les mollusques d'Adanson. Journal de Conchyliologie 85: 104–366
 Houart, R. (2014). Living Muricidae of the world. Muricinae. Murex, Promurex, Haustellum, Bolinus, Vokesimurex and Siratus. Harxheim: ConchBooks. 197 pp

External links
 Gmelin J.F. (1791). Vermes. In: Gmelin J.F. (Ed.) Caroli a Linnaei Systema Naturae per Regna Tria Naturae, Ed. 13. Tome 1(6). G.E. Beer, Lipsiae
 Sowerby, G. B. I; Sowerby, G. B. II. (1832–1841). The conchological illustrations or, Coloured figures of all the hitherto unfigured recent shells. London, privately published.

Muricidae
Molluscs of the Atlantic Ocean
Molluscs of Brazil
Invertebrates of West Africa
Gastropods described in 1791